Alice Alaso (sometimes referred to as Alice Alaso Asianut) (born 21 January 1969) is a Ugandan teacher and politician who was the Woman Representative for Serere District in Uganda's eighth, ninth and tenth parliaments. She was politically affiliated with the Forum for Democratic Change (FDC) and was the party's first Secretary General for ten years.

Background and education 
Alaso obtained a Bachelor of Arts in Education from Makerere University.

Career 
As a teacher, Alaso taught at Teso College Aloet between 1993 and 1997. During this time, she also taught part-time at Saint Mary's Madera.

After leaving Teso College in 1997, she became a District Gender Officer on the Post-Conflict Recovery Program mainly responsible for Kaberamaido District.

In 2018, Alaso left the Forum for Democratic Change where she had been serving as the Secretary General. Other sources claim that she was fired from the party and the position. 

She joined the Alliance for National Transformation (ANT) and as of March 2022, she was listed as the party's Acting National Coordinator.

Personal life 
Alaso has been married to Johnson Ebaju since 2007.

References 

Living people
1969 births
People from Serere District
Makerere University alumni
Women members of the Parliament of Uganda
Members of the Parliament of Uganda